The 2014 IAAF World Challenge was the fifth edition of the annual, global circuit of one-day track and field competitions organized by the International Association of Athletics Federations (IAAF). The series featured a total of thirteen meetings as the meeting – both the Moscow Challenge and IAAF World Challenge Dakar were dropped from the programme.

Schedule

References

External links
Official website

2014
World Challenge Meetings